The National Library of Aruba (Papiamento: Biblioteca Nacional Aruba, BNA) is the main library of Aruba. It is located in Oranjestad and holds more than 100,000 volumes.

BNA serves as both the national and the public library of Aruba. It was founded on August 20, 1949 as the island's public library and reading room. After Aruba gained its status aparte in 1986 the Aruba Public Library (Papiamento: Biblioteca Publico Aruba) officially became the National Library of Aruba.

BNA has a public library branch in San Nicolas, and a separate building, Arubiana-Caribiana, housing the National and special collections, located in Oranjestad, near the main branch.

See also 
 *Wikimedia Commons: Media contributed by Biblioteca Nacional Aruba
 List of national libraries
 National Archives of Aruba

References

External links
 Biblioteca National Aruba (official website)
 Biblioteca National Aruba - Coleccion Digital Nacional (digital collections platform)

Further reading
 

Aruba
Libraries in Aruba
Buildings and structures in Oranjestad, Aruba